Francis Chalwell Sutherland (12 December 1929 – 16 March 1988) was an Australian rules footballer who played with St Kilda in the Victorian Football League (VFL).

Notes

External links 

1988 deaths
1929 births
Australian rules footballers from Melbourne
St Kilda Football Club players
People from Parkdale, Victoria